Oh Hyon-ho (born 29 October 1986) is a South Korean ice hockey player. He competed in the 2018 Winter Olympics.

References

External links

1986 births
Living people
Daemyung Killer Whales players
High1 players
Ice hockey players at the 2018 Winter Olympics
South Korean ice hockey defencemen
Olympic ice hockey players of South Korea
Asian Games medalists in ice hockey
Asian Games silver medalists for South Korea
Asian Games bronze medalists for South Korea
Ice hockey players at the 2007 Asian Winter Games
Ice hockey players at the 2017 Asian Winter Games
Medalists at the 2007 Asian Winter Games
Medalists at the 2017 Asian Winter Games